Edward James Owen (fourth ¼ 1903  – death unknown) was a Welsh rugby union and professional rugby league footballer who played in the 1920s.

Background
Edward Owen was born in Crumlin, Wales, and his birth was registered in Bedwellty district, Wales.

Playing career

Challenge Cup Final appearances
Edward Owen played  in York's 8-22 defeat by Halifax in the 1930–31 Challenge Cup Final during the 1930–31 season at Wembley Stadium, London on Saturday 2 May 1931, in front of a crowd of 40,368.

Contemporaneous article extract
"E. J. Owen' York (Northern Rugby League.) E. J. Owen was born in Crumlin, and is proving his worth as a full back. He was discovered by Leeds officials, but the Headingley club with a great wealth of talent allowed him to go to York. He is a brilliant defensive player, and can kick with great power with either foot. He is also a great goalkeeper. Owen has been unfortunate in coming to hand when there were so many full backs of ability in the league. He was, however, selected as reserve to Sullivan for the Wales and England match in 1926."

References

External links
Search for "Owen" at rugbyleagueproject.org

1903 births
Crumlin RFC players
Leeds Rhinos players
People from Crumlin, Caerphilly
Rugby league players from Caerphilly County Borough
Rugby union players from Caerphilly County Borough
Place of death missing
Rugby league fullbacks
Rugby league players from Bedwellty
Rugby union players from Crumlin
Welsh rugby league players
Welsh rugby union players
Year of death missing
York Wasps players